Falsomesosella breuningi is a species of beetle in the family Cerambycidae. It was described by Maurice Pic in 1944. No subspecies are known.

References

breuningi
Beetles described in 1944